HD 283572 is a young T Tauri-type pre-main sequence star in the constellation of Taurus about  away, belonging to the Taurus Molecular Cloud. It is a rather evolved protostar which already dispersed its birth shroud.  The star emits a very high X-ray flux of 1031 ergs/s. That radiation flux associated with the magnetic activity induced a high coronal temperature of 3 kEv and regular flares. HD 283572 will eventually evolve to an A-type main-sequence star when on the main sequence. It is no longer accreting mass, and is magnetically decoupled from the remnants of the protoplanetary disk, belonging to the terminal, 3rd phase of the disk evolution.

Protoplanetary system
HD 283572 is surrounded by a light (<0.0004 ) and faint protoplanetary disk with uncertain inclination. Different instruments yielded measurements of disk inclination to the plane of sky from 35 to 60 degrees. A search for planetary transits was performed but no planets were detected as of 2019.

References 

T Tauri stars
Circumstellar disks
Taurus (constellation)
J04215884+2818066
Tauri, V987
BD+27 657
020388
283572